The Yunior Kurgan is a junior ice hockey team from Kurgan, farm-club of Zauralie Kurgan. They are members of the National Minor Hockey League (NMHL), the second-level of junior hockey in the country.

External links 
Official Page
Ice hockey teams in Russia
Junior Hockey League (Russia) teams
2011 establishments in Russia
Ice hockey clubs established in 2011